Rockin' Revival is the second album by Servant, released by Tunesmith Records in 1982, and was also the first album with Matt Spransy in the lineup. The original cover featured a picture of a revival meeting using a fisheye lens, but was later replaced by a number of concert photographs. The songs "Ad Man" and the high-energy "I'm Gonna Live" both quickly became concert staples. In 2011, Rockin' Revival was added to the "CCM's 500 Best Albums of All Time" blog at No. 176.

Reissue
On July 11, 2006, Rockin' Revival was reissued on CD by Retroactive Records.

Track listing

Credits 
Musicians
 Sandie Brock: Lead vocals & percussion
 Bob Hardy: Lead vocals & percussion
 Bruce Wright: Lead guitar
 Owen Brock: Rhythm guitar & vocals
 Matt Spransy: Polymoog, Prophet-5, Oberheim Synthesisers
 Rob Martens: Bass guitar & vocals
 David Holmes: Drums & vocals (lead vocals on "Isolated" and "Suburban Josephine")

Production
 Producer: Bob Brooks for Signature Productions, Inc.
 Engineer: Bob Rock
 Assistant Engineer: Mike Fraser
 Studio: Little Mountain Sound Studios
 Remastered by Rev at Creation Station Media
 Reissue Executive Producer: Matthew Hunt

References

External links
 

1981 albums
Servant (band) albums